Golden Chick, formerly known as Golden Fried Chicken, is a quick-service restaurant franchise headquartered in Richardson, Texas. Mark Parmerlee, head of Golden Tree Restaurants serves as the President and Chairman. 

The first restaurant was in 1967 in San Marcos, Texas, under the name Golden Fried Chicken. Franchising started in 1972. A decade later, the franchise grew to a number of restaurants primarily in Central Texas, with a focus on cities like Houston, Austin and San Antonio.  Eventually it expanded outside to the Dallas-Fort Worth Metroplex, and then crossed the state line into Oklahoma. There are currently 210 restaurants operating in Texas, Oklahoma, Georgia, Louisiana, and Florida.  In 2022, Golden Chick was included in Nation’s Restaurant News’ Top 200 Restaurant Brands in the U.S. (#142).  Focused on innovation and growth, Golden Chick recently completed its third modular constructed restaurant. 

Since 1985, the chain's flagship menu item has been its chicken strips, trademarked as Golden Tenders. In 1996, Golden Fried Chicken abbreviated to its present name, Golden Chick. The family-oriented brand is the creator of the Original Golden Tenders® and the Big & Golden™ Chicken Sandwich, along with other chef-inspired menu items including its Golden Roast Chicken and Zagat-recognized Chicken Salad. 

In 2017, Golden Chick celebrated its 50th anniversary, and sponsored Texas Country Reporter.

The parent company of Golden Chick, Golden Tree Restaurants, has other subsidiaries: Heff's Burgers, Jalapeno Tree, JC's Burger House, Texadelphia and Fireside Pies.

See also
 List of fast-food chicken restaurants

References

External links
Golden Chick

Fast-food poultry restaurants
Fast-food chains of the United States
Fast-food franchises
Restaurants in Texas
Regional restaurant chains in the United States
Companies based in Dallas
Restaurants established in 1967
1967 establishments in Texas
Chicken chains of the United States